Wólka  is a village in the administrative district of Gmina Koniecpol, within Częstochowa County, Silesian Voivodeship, in southern Poland.

The village has a population of 75.

References

Villages in Częstochowa County